Rein Van Helden (born 24 July 2002) is a Belgian professional footballer who plays as a centre-back for Eerste Divisie club MVV, on loan from Sint-Truiden.

Career

Sint-Truiden
Van Helden joined the Genk youth academy in 2011 from his childhood club Genker VV. Five years later he moved to the Sint-Truiden academy. He signed his first professional contract with the club in May 2021, after having torn the anterior cruciate ligament on his right knee a few months earlier in February 2021.

Loan to MVV
On 13 August 2022, Van Helden joined Eerste Divisie club MVV on a one-season loan deal. There, he made his professional debut on 19 August 2022, replacing Mart Remans in injury time of a 3–1 league win over ADO Den Haag. After a difficult start, where he was mainly a substitute, he made his first start for MVV on 16 September in a 4–1 win over Jong Ajax as a replacement for the injured Matteo Waem. He put in a strong performance during the game, and would remain a starter in central defense from then on. On 30 September in a home game against Willem II, Van Helden scored his first professional goal, heading home the 3–2 winner for MVV in the 95th minute to complete a comeback from 2–0 down.

Personal life
Van Helden is the son of Koen Van Helden, who played professional football for Patro Eisden Maasmechelen, but had to retire prematurely due to a skull fracture. He would later go on to coach Bilzerse Waltwilder VV, Eendracht Mechelen-aan-de-Maas and KFC Park Houthalen.

Career statistics

References

External links

2002 births
Living people
Sportspeople from Genk
Belgian footballers
Belgian expatriate footballers
Association football defenders
K.R.C. Genk players
Sint-Truidense V.V. players
MVV Maastricht players
Eerste Divisie players
Expatriate footballers in the Netherlands
Belgian expatriate sportspeople in the Netherlands
Footballers from Limburg (Belgium)